Enrique Martinez y Martinez (born 10 November 1948 in Saltillo) is a Mexican politician affiliated with the Revolutionary Institutional Party. He has served as Mexico's Ambassador to Cuba since 2016. He previously served as Governor of Coahuila from 2 December 1999 to 17 February 2005, day of your resignation.

Martínez y Martínez received a bachelor's degree in economics from the Monterrey Institute of Technology and Higher Studies. After graduation, he taught several courses in economics at the Autonomous University of Coahuila and at the Antonio Narro Autonomous Agricultural University (in Spanish: Universidad Autonoma Agraria Antonio Narro).

He joined the private sector as president of Grupo Empresarial Martínez, started his political career as municipal president of Saltillo (1979–81) and has been elected twice to the Chamber of Deputies: 1988–91, representing Coahuila's First District, and 
1997–99, representing its Seventh District.

In 1999, as the PRI candidate for governor, he defeated a coalition of four parties with 60% of the vote and started serving as governor of Coahuila on 1 December; his term expired on 1 December 2005, and he was succeeded by Humberto Moreira Valdés.

During the early months of 2005 Martínez tried unsuccessfully to secure his party nomination for the 2006 presidential election.

He is married to María Guadalupe Morales and has two sons and a daughter: Enrique, Eduardo and Ana Sofía.

See also 
 List of presidents of Saltillo Municipality

References

External links
Government of Coahuila: Enrique Martínez

1948 births
Living people
Ambassadors of Mexico to Cuba
Mexican Secretaries of Agriculture
Governors of Coahuila
Politicians from Saltillo
Monterrey Institute of Technology and Higher Education alumni
Institutional Revolutionary Party politicians
20th-century Mexican politicians
21st-century Mexican politicians
Academic staff of the Autonomous University of Coahuila
Municipal presidents in Coahuila